The Supreme Court Economic Review is an academic journal published by the University of Chicago Press. The journal applies economic and legal scholarship to the work of the United States Supreme Court. Articles consider the implicit or explicit economic reasoning employed by the Court to reach its decisions, and explains the economic consequences of the Court's decisions. SCER is published in conjunction with the Law and Economics Center at the George Mason University School of Law.

External links
 Supreme Court Economic Review homepage
 Law and Economics Center at the George Mason University School of Law
 Univ of Chicago

American law journals
Economics journals
University of Chicago Press academic journals
English-language journals